Captain Dennis Latimer  (31 August 1895 – 12 January 1976) was a British World War I flying ace notable for achieving twenty-eight aerial victories, all against enemy fighter aircraft.

Early life
Latimer was born in Withington, Shropshire, to James Davies and Ida Lottie Latimer. By 1901 the family was residing in Towyn, Merionethshire, Wales, where his father was a hotel proprietor.

World War I
Latimer was commissioned from cadet to temporary second lieutenant (on probation) for duty in the Royal Flying Corps on 26 January 1917, and was appointed a flying officer on 27 April. In early 1918 he was posted to No. 20 Squadron RFC to fly a Bristol F.2b two-seater fighter. Latimer scored his first victory on 13 March with Lieutenant James Scaramanga as his observer/gunner, the only one he scored in the Royal Flying Corps. On 1 April 1918, the Army's Royal Flying Corps was merged with the Royal Naval Air Service to form the Royal Air Force. Latimer was then paired with Lieutenant Tom Noel, gaining his second victory on 21 April. Latimer and Noel gained another 13 victories between 8 and 20 May, and on 25 May Latimer was appointed a flight commander with the temporary rank of captain. Latimer and Noel gained nine more victories in June and July, and in August Latimer and Sergeant Arthur Newland gained five more. However, on 22 August, Latimer was again flying with Noel, when they were shot down by Leutnant Willi Nebgen of Jasta 7. Noel was killed and Latimer captured. Latimer's final total claimed in conjunction with his gunners was one aircraft captured, seventeen destroyed (including one shared), and ten 'out of control' wins (two shared), making him the highest-scoring ace of No. 20 Squadron.

Latimer was subsequently awarded the Military Cross which was gazetted on 13 September. His citation read:
Temporary Lieutenant Dennis Latimer, RAF.
"For conspicuous gallantry and devotion to duty on offensive patrol. He and his observer in four days' fighting destroyed seven enemy machines and drove down three. They did magnificent service."

A week later his award of the Distinguished Flying Cross was published, the citation reading:
Lieutenant (Temporary Captain) Dennis Latimer, MC.
"When leading an offensive patrol this officer displayed great skill and bravery. Having shot down a scout in flames, he immediately engaged a second, which he destroyed after a short combat. In addition, he has accounted for four other machines."

Latimer was eventually repatriated following the armistice, and was transferred to the RAF's unemployed list on 10 April 1919.

List of aerial victories

References

Bibliography

1895 births
1976 deaths
Royal Air Force officers
Military personnel from Shropshire
People from Telford and Wrekin
Royal Flying Corps officers
Royal Air Force personnel of World War I
British World War I flying aces
Recipients of the Military Cross
Recipients of the Distinguished Flying Cross (United Kingdom)
British World War I prisoners of war
World War I prisoners of war held by Germany